The 2020–21 season is Sevan's first season in the Armenian Premier League.

Season events
On 1 December, the Football Federation of Armenia Disciplinary Committee voted in favor to remove Sevan from the Armenian Premier League after they failed to turn up for two games in a row, against Alashkert and BKMA Yerevan. As a result, all of Sevan's results were excluded from the championship table.

Squad

Transfers

In

Released

Friendlies

Competitions

Overall record

Premier League

Results summary

Results by round

Results

Table

Armenian Cup

Statistics

Appearances and goals

|-
|colspan="16"|Players away on loan:
|-
|colspan="16"|Players who left Sevan during the season:
|}

Goal scorers

Clean sheets

Disciplinary Record

References

Sevan